Dimmitt is a meteorite that fell in prehistoric times in The United States. It was named after the nearest town of Dimmitt, Texas.

History
Dimmitt is also currently one of 311 approved meteorites from Texas and one of 1801 approved meteorites from the United States. 

There is currently a large collection of Dimmitt meteorites held in the Meteorite Collection of the University of New Mexico Institute of Meteoritics and in the Oscar Monnig Collection.

References

Meteorites found in the United States